Florida State University College of Law is the law school of Florida State University located in Tallahassee, Florida.

The law school borders the southeast quadrant of the University's campus, near the Donald L. Tucker Center, an arena and part of the Tallahassee civic center area. The College of Law campus consists of four major buildings, four historic houses around a green and five parking lots. It occupies two full city blocks and is directly across the street from the Florida Supreme Court and one block from the Florida Legislature. The school's most recent addition is its 50,000-square-foot Advocacy Center, which includes five courtrooms.

According to Florida State University's 2016 ABA-required disclosures, 72.6% of the Class of 2015 obtained full-time, long-term, bar passage required employment ten months after graduation. According to those same disclosures, 81.7% of the Class of 2015 obtained full-time, long-term, bar passage required jobs or JD preferred positions within ten months of graduation.

History

 The College of Law was founded in 1966, and holds classes in the B.K. Roberts building, named in honor of the Florida Supreme Court Justice's role in creating Tallahassee's first law school at nearby Florida A&M University, in 1949. Roberts held the State of Florida must provide African Americans some form of legal education in denying Virgil D. Hawkins admissions to the University of Florida Law School. Sixteen years later, the Florida legislature voted in 1965 to close FAMU law and open a law school at Florida State University by transferring allocated funds from FAMU law to Florida State University's law school.

Programs
The College of Law offers the Juris Doctor (J.D.), which is the first professional law degree. The three-year program provides students a foundational first-year program, a legal writing program, and a varied offering of upper-level courses, seminars, clinics, and co-curricular activities.

Externship programs exist in the United States and abroad — including at the International Bar Association in London, the International Criminal Tribunal for the former Yugoslavia in the Hague, the Special Court of Sierra Leone, in Washington, D.C., and in every major city in Florida, allowing students to spend a semester outside of Tallahassee.

The College of Law offers a Master of Laws (LL.M.) program in Environmental Law and Policy, as well as an LL.M. program for foreign lawyers. Additionally, the College of Law offers certificate programs and its faculty also offer a significant range of courses in Criminal Law.

The College of Law offers a Master of Studies in Law (J.M.), Juris Master degree. It has multiple concentrations and it is designed for non-attorneys to get a deep understanding of law in their respective fields of work. Some of these fields or specialties are Cyber Security, Financial Regulation, Employment Law, Human Resources Risk Management, Healthcare Regulation, Environmental Law, Criminal Law, etc. This masters degree program is a two year program for full-time working professionals and has rigorous requirements to be accepted into the program as it is very selective.

The College of Law offers joint degree programs allowing students to earn other degrees in conjunction with the J.D., including Master of Arts, Master of Science, Master of Business Administration, and Ph.D. degrees.

National rankings

In the 2022 edition, U.S. News & World Report ranked FSU 48th overall.

In 2016, "Above the Law" ranked FSU 37th in the U.S., based on job placement success, low cost, and alumni satisfaction.

In 2015, The National Jurist has ranked Florida State University College of Law the 13th best value law school in the nation.

In 2014, National Jurist ranked the College of Law as the 10th "Best Value Law School" in the country based on employment, bar passage rates, tuition, cost of living and average debt upon graduation.

A 2012 update of Leiter's Law School Rankings rated the law school faculty the nation's 33rd best in terms of per capita scholarly impact.

In 2014, Hispanic Business magazine ranked Florida State the nation's 2nd best law school for Hispanic students.

In 2011, PreLaw magazine ranked Florida State the nation's 3rd "Best Value" law school and  has been ranked "top 10" for three years in a row.

In 2010, National Jurist magazine ranked the law library the 30th best in the nation.

In 2013, National Jurist magazine ranked Florida State the nation's 34th best law school in the country.

Employment
According to Florida State University's official 2016 ABA-required disclosures, 72.6% of the Class of 2015 obtained full-time, long-term, bar passage required employment ten months after graduation. Florida State University's Law School Transparency under-employment score is 8.3%, indicating the percentage of the Class of 2015 unemployed, pursuing an additional degree, or working in a non-professional, short-term, or part-time job nine months after graduation.

Costs
Tuition at Florida State University College of Law for the 2016–17 academic year is $20,643 for Florida residents and $40,655 for non-Florida residents. Most non-residents are eligible to reclassify as Florida residents for tuition purposes after their 1L year. According to Florida State University's ABA-Required 509 Disclosure, approximately 60% of current students receive a scholarship, with the median award being $10,500.

Faculty
In a recent study of faculty productivity of law schools Florida State Law ranked third and was the top law school in Florida and the most productive in the Southeastern U.S. The faculty scholarship of Florida State Law regularly ranks among the top 30 law schools based on downloads, according to the Social Science Research Network, which hosts working papers by Florida State Law Faculty in Public Law and Legal Theory, Law, Business & Economics and Sustainability Law & Policy.

Nationally prominent law professors at FSU include faculty in:  Administrative and Regulatory Law (Mark Seidenfeld); Constitutional Law (Nat Stern);  Criminal Law (Wayne Logan, Gary Kleck); Environmental, Energy and Land Use Law (Donna R. Christie, David L. Markell, Hannah Wiseman); International Law (Frederick M. Abbott, Fernando Tesón); Law & Humanities, including Legal Philosophy (Rob Atkinson and Fernando Tesón); Law, Economics & Business (Bruce L. Benson, Manuel Utset, Kelli Alces, Shawn Bayern); and Tax Law (Joseph M. Dodge, Steve Johnson, Jeffrey Kahn).

Florida State Law faculty members have published their own casebooks in environmental law — David Markell and Donna Christie. Other faculty authored books are widely used in law schools across the country for courses in Tax Law (Joseph M. Dodge), International Intellectual Property Law (Frederick M. Abbott), and Law and Economics (Mark Seidenfeld). Beyond the classroom, Florida State Law faculty members are regularly cited as authorities by courts, law reform bodies and other scholars. One faculty member, Sandy D'Alemberte, is a former president of both the American Bar Association and the National Judicature Society.

Affiliated faculty from other university departments holding courtesy appointments at the law school include John Scholz, a leading political scientist addressing regulatory enforcement; Bruce L. Benson, an economist focused and law and economics; R. Mark Isaac, a leading experimental economist; and Gary Kleck, a criminologist known for his work on guns and deterrence.

Journals 
The Florida State University Law Review is the flagship law review of Florida State Law. It publishes four issues a year.

The Journal of Land Use and Environmental Law is the state's first and remains its only student publication in the field. It ranks among the top environmental and land use law journals based on citations.

The Journal of Transnational Law & Policy publishes articles in the field of international law, including human rights, comparative law and U.S. foreign policy.

The Florida State University Business Review is a law journal published annually at the College of Law which examines the interrelated disciplines of business and law. Originally founded and published by second year law students in 2001, the Business Review has become an official journal of the College of Law.

Alumni

Notes

External links
 

 
ABA-accredited law schools in Florida
Educational institutions established in 1966
1966 establishments in Florida